Fifteen Years is a compilation album by The Early November. It includes 15 new acoustic recordings from the course of the band's career.

Track listing
All songs written by Ace Enders.
 "Narrow Mouth" - 04:11
 "Outside" - 04:06
 "The Mountain Range In My Living Room" - 03:51
 "Boxing Timelines" - 03:44
 "Tell Me Why" - 03:40
 "A Little More Time" - 03:27
 "Decoration" - 03:14
 "Call Off The Bells" - 04:02
 "Frayed In Doubt" - 03:40
 "I Don't Care" - 04:16
 "In Currents" - 03:05
 "Figure It Out" - 03:45
 "Driving South" - 03:16
 "Sunday Drive" - 03:40
 "Ever So Sweet" - 04:58

Personnel

 Arthur "Ace" Enders – vocals, rhythm guitar 
 Jeff Kummer – drums
 Joseph Marro – guitar, keyboard, piano
 Bill Lugg – lead guitar
 Sergio Anello – bass

References

The Early November albums
2015 albums
Rise Records albums